= Non-national =

Person not born in a specific country

In Ireland, a non-national is a person who is not from Ireland, though they may have Irish citizenship. The concept regularly arises in the media when discussing people from outside Ireland. However, Mark Walsh considers it a nonsense term since "non-national" can be interpreted as a person lacking any nationality whatsoever.

== See also ==
- Non-citizen
